Richard Bernard (fl. 1377–1395) was an English politician.

He was a Member (MP) of the Parliament of England for New Shoreham from 1377 to 1395.

References

Year of death missing
Year of birth unknown
English MPs October 1377
English MPs 1381
English MPs May 1382
English MPs November 1384
English MPs 1386
English MPs February 1388
English MPs September 1388
English MPs January 1390
English MPs 1393
English MPs 1395
People from Shoreham-by-Sea